The so-called Battle of the Spurs took place about  north of Holton, Kansas, near Netawaka, Kansas, on January 31, 1859. Abolitionist John Brown, together with J. H. Kagi and Aaron Dwight Stevens, was escorting a group of 11 escaped slaves from the slave state of Missouri to freedom in Iowa. At Straight Creek they faced a posse of U.S. marshals and others, who hoped to earn the $3,000 reward posted for Brown's capture. Brown, who "inspired terror in his enemies",
faced a posse of 45 while his party only consisted of 21, including women and children. Brown led his party straight ahead, and the posse turned and ran in panic. Not a shot was fired nor a rifle raised. "Free-Staters labeled the confrontation the 'Battle of the Spurs,' in mocking reference to the proslavery posse fleeing on horseback." There is a historical marker.

See also
 Bleeding Kansas

References

Bleeding Kansas
John Brown (abolitionist)
Battles and conflicts without fatalities
Tourist attractions in Jackson County, Kansas
Fugitive American slaves
John Brown and family in Kansas